Killamery Cross is a 9th-century high cross and National Monument in Killamery, County Kilkenny, Ireland.  It is located in the north of Killamery graveyard.

History
A monastery was established at Killamery by St Gobhan, a disciple of Saint Fursey, in AD 632. The Killamery High cross is part of the western Ossory group of crosses, used as a model for many of the small high crosses sold across the world as an Irish symbol.

Locals formerly touched the cross's capstone to cure headaches.

Description
It is richly sculptured on the shaft with marigold flowers carved on it. There is a boss in the middle of the wheel-head that is surrounded by interlacing snakes and, above the boss, an open-mouthed dragon, giving it the name of the Snake-Dragon Cross.

The western face has a sun swastika at the centre and also depicts Adam and Eve, a stag hunt and a chariot procession.  On top of the cross is a gabled cap-stone. Noah and John the Baptist are depicted. On the base an inscription reads OR DO MAELSECHNAILL, "a prayer for Máel Sechnaill", who was high king of Ireland in 846–862.

Other artefacts
There is also a cross-slab of an earlier date the inscription OROIT AR ANMAIN N-AEDAIN, "Pray for the soul of Áedáin". Two bullaun stones can also be seen. There is also a holy well, St Goban's Well.

References

National Monuments in County Kilkenny
High crosses in the Republic of Ireland
Religion in County Kilkenny
9th-century sculptures